The mission of the Sound Adirondack Growth Alliance (SAGA), a seven-year-old organization operating in Saranac Lake, New York, is "To enhance and protect the unique character of our communities through sound planning and development." Officially, SAGA has said: "This is not about Wal-Mart or any other retailer. It is about making sure our community can maintain its small-town character, something that becomes more important every year for tourism-based communities such as ours. It is about making sure any retailer or any commercial development that comes to town is an appropriate size, has an appearance that fits in with the character of our community and addresses costs for the additional infrastructure (water, sewer, highways, SEQR requirements, etc)... SAGA has decided not to oppose any retailer that meets the following criteria:
Is attractive in appearance and develops the area using state of the art methods to minimize the environmental impact of the new structure(s) and parking lot, including light pollution;
Is located in a suitable spot;
Absorbs the additional costs of upgrading all the infrastructure that will be required of a commercial development."

The Wal-Mart corporation backed down from its original plans to build in Saranac Lake, but in 2006 announced new plans to build a  Supercenter on Lake Flower Avenue. SAGA recognizes the need for improved shopping, particularly since the Ames department store closed, and especially sees the need for a high quality grocery store. The community has retail sources, but only one major grocery store chain (which operates two stores in the village - one located downtown and one located at one entrance to the village). SAGA continues to work to advocate for downtown development and a retail cap, and continues to educate the community about the harmful effects of Wal-Mart.

External links
https://web.archive.org/web/20060828101228/http://soundgrowth.info/

Environmental organizations based in New York (state)
Saranac Lake, New York